Roseanne is an American television sitcom that was originally broadcast on ABC from October 18, 1988, to May 20, 1997, with a revival season that premiered in 2018. Lauded for its realistic portrayal of the average American family, the series stars Roseanne Barr, and revolves around the Conners, an Illinois working-class family. In the ninth season, Roseanne and her family win the lottery and associate with "high society." In the final episode Roseanne reveals not only was she writing a story and they did not win the lottery, but also says Dan had actually died from a heart attack in season 8.

In season 10, it is revealed that Dan is still alive. Roseanne fabricated his doom as well, along with a multitude of other things. This set most things back as they were in season 8, with the exception of the birth of Darlene's daughter. Barr said the lottery storyline was done to illustrate the American Dream philosophy.

On May 16, 2017, it was announced ABC would produce an eight-episode 10th season revival of the series, set to air as a mid-season replacement in 2018, with the original cast returning. In November 2017, it was announced that ABC had ordered an additional episode for the new season bringing the total up to 9. The tenth season debuted on March 27, 2018.  On March 30, 2018, the series was renewed for an eleventh season of 13 episodes by ABC. However, ABC reversed its decision and canceled the series on May 29, 2018, after Barr posted a controversial tweet about former Senior Advisor Valerie Jarrett.

On June 21, 2018, the show was revived as a spin-off entitled The Conners, which has the same cast as Roseanne after her character dies of a drug overdose. The show premiered on October 16, 2018, and has aired four seasons on ABC, with a fifth set to premiere in Fall 2022.

Series overview

Episodes

Season 1 (1988–89)

Season 2 (1989–90)
Note: The entire season was directed by John Pasquin.

Season 3 (1990–91)

Season 4 (1991–92)

Season 5 (1992–93)

Season 6 (1993–94)

Season 7 (1994–95)
Note: Due to a timeslot shift by ABC  of Home Improvement  to Tuesdays at 9:00 p.m., which was a reaction to NBC's move of Frasier to Tuesdays at 9:00 p.m., Roseanne was moved to Wednesdays at 9:00 p.m. for this season.

Season 8 (1995–96)
Note: Starting with this season (and the rest of the series), Roseanne was moved back to Tuesdays, but to 8:00 p.m. instead of the original 9:00 p.m.

Season 9 (1996–97)

Season 10 (2018)

Notes and references

Lists of American sitcom episodes